The 13th FIS Speed Ski World Cup season began on 26 February 2012, in Pas de la Casa-Grandvalira, Andorra, and was concluded on 18 April 2012, at Verbier, Switzerland.

Calendar

Key

Men

Ladies

References

Skiing world competitions
Speed skiing competitions
2012 in winter sports